Big City Greens is an American animated comedy adventure television series created by The Houghton Brothers that premiered on Disney Channel on June 18, 2018. The series features the voices of Chris Houghton, Marieve Herington, Bob Joles, and Artemis Pebdani.

Premise
After losing his farm in the country town of Smalton, Bill Green and his two children Cricket and Tilly move in with his mother Alice Green (Gramma), who lives on a small farm in the middle of a city known as "Big City."

By the second half of season three, Bill moves his family back to Smalton after regaining his farm with Cricket's friend Remy coming along for the ride.

Episodes

Characters

Main
 Cricket (voiced by Chris Houghton) is a 10-year-old troublemaking country boy who is always barefoot. He was fascinated by every discovery he would make in Big City. He got a job in Big Coffee in "Critterball Crisis" until it closed in "Chipwrecked". Later, he worked as a delivery boy at the Gloria + Green Café in the early episodes of Season 3, until his family moved back to Smalton in "The Move". His middle name is revealed to be Ernest, after his late paternal grandfather in "Bleeped".
 Tilly (voiced by Marieve Herington) is Cricket's older sister, with an eccentric and imaginative nature. She is frequently accompanied by Saxon, a homemade doll Tilly created out of an old sack. Although she is very cheerful and incredibly kind, she has moments of selfishness, like her younger brother. This was shown in the episode "Mama Bird" when she was angry and jealous because the birds didn't show any affection towards her and instead favored Cricket. In "The Move", it is revealed that Tilly was born in the woods.
 Bill (voiced by Bob Joles as an adult; Andre Robinson as a child) is Cricket and Tilly's father and Gramma Alice's son. A skilled farmer, Bill is overprotective and cautious, having lost part of a finger because of a hay baler accident.
 Gramma Alice (voiced by Artemis Pebdani) is Bill's mother and Cricket and Tilly's paternal grandmother, who owns the Green family farm in Big City. She frequently exhibits cantankerous and combative behavior to hide her love and affection for her family. In the Season 2 finale, she becomes the investor of the Gloria + Greens Café. When the family moves back to their farm in "The Move", Alice initially decides to stay in Big City, but since "Homeward Hound" she is currently staying with her family for a long "visit" (having used the farm animals sneaking into Big City as an excuse). Her full name is revealed to be Alice Delores Green in "Cricket Versus".
 Nancy (voiced by Wendi McLendon-Covey as an adult, Candace Kozak as a child) is Cricket and Tilly's mother and Bill's ex-wife. A former biker with a rebellious streak, she was briefly incarcerated before being released after the family moved to Big City. While they are divorced, she and Bill remain good friends, and she is a frequent presence in the children's lives; she even moves with the family when they buy their farm in Smalton back.
 Remy (voiced by Zeno Robinson) is Cricket's best friend, whom he meets shortly after moving to Big City. He comes from a rich family – being optimistic and fun-loving, but he also struggles with his self-confidence. He later tags along with the Greens in their move back to Smalton. His last name is revealed to be Remington in "Remy Rescue".

Recurring

 Gloria (voiced by Anna Akana) is the former Japanese-American barista at Big Coffee, who becomes friends and co-workers with Cricket. She dreams of one day saving up enough money to leave Big City and move to Paris. After "Chipocalypse Now" (due to Big Coffee closing), Gloria gets evicted from her apartment and moves in with the Greens. In "'Rent Control", her full name is revealed to be "Gloria Sato" (derived from her parents' known surnames). In the Season 2 finale, she succeeds in opening her dream coffeehouse, with help from the Greens, called the Gloria + Green Café. After Gramma goes to "visit" her family in Smalton during the second half of Season 3, Gloria takes care of her house.
 Officer Keys (voiced by Andy Daly as an adult, Jason Maybaum as a child) is a muscular Big City police officer with an overly cheery and oblivious personality. He can get serious at times when policing people.
 Kiki (voiced by Monica Ray in most appearances, Stephanie Sheh in "Pen Pals") is part of a group of children that frequently play with Cricket, Tilly, and Remy. Her last name is revealed to be Kitashima in "Chipocalypse Now".
 Benny (voiced by Luke Lowe) is part of a group of children that frequently play with Cricket, Tilly, and Remy.
 Weezie (voiced by Lamar Woods) is part of a group of children that frequently play with Cricket, Tilly and Remy. His real name is revealed to be Westley Eastman in "Chipocalypse Now".
 Brett (voiced by Colton Dunn) is the Greens' easygoing former next-door neighbor who works at an animal shelter. His last name is revealed to be Eze in "Chipocalypse Now".
 Chip Whistler (voiced by Paul Scheer) is the Green family's rival and manager of the Wholesome Foods supermarket, a parody of Whole Foods Market. In Season 2, he becomes the CEO of the Wholesome Foods Corporation after his father's retirement and plans to run the Greens out of Big City. A running gag is that his attempts to defeat the Greens get his front tooth chipped (except for "Friend Con", in which all his other teeth fell out instead), though his front tooth would somehow be repaired by the next appearance. Since "Chipocalypse Now", Chip is now banned from Big City and he has not been seen again since.
 Vasquez (voiced by Danny Trejo) is Remy's bodyguard who watches over him when his parents are unavailable.
 Rashida Remington (voiced by Lorraine Toussaint) is Remy's well-to-do mother who works as a lawyer.
 Russell Remington (voiced by Colton Dunn) is Remy's father and Rashida's husband. He is a lawyer and former football player for the Big City Bengals.
 Ms. Cho (voiced by Anna Akana) is the former owner of Big Coffee and Gloria and Cricket's boss. She only communicates via grunting. Her first name is Miriam, as revealed in "Cricket's Kapowie". In "Chipwrecked", Chip Whistler bribes Ms. Cho into retirement, which results in Big Coffee closing. She has not been seen since.
 Andromeda (voiced by Nicole Byer) is Tilly's best friend. She is a conspiracy theorist with a strong belief in aliens, supernatural phenomena, and government cover-ups.
 Alucard Grigorian (voiced by Maurice LaMarche) is an old Armenian man who is the neighbor of Brett and formerly, the Greens and has personal issues with Gramma. His first name is revealed in "Chipocalypse Now".
 Gabriella Espinosa (voiced by Jenna Ortega) is Cricket's girlfriend and female counterpart. She's as troublemaking and rambunctious as Cricket is as well as sharing his interests.
 Gregly (voiced by Tim Robinson) is Cricket's grumpy friend who has a habit of screaming everything he says.
 Maria Media (voiced by Raven-Symoné) is a local news reporter in Big City.
 Community Sue (voiced by Betsy Sodaro as an adult, Monica Ray as a child) is the director of the Big City Community Center. She constantly shouts during conversations and regularly encourages others to adopt more health-conscious behaviors. Her last name is revealed to be Lanemoto in "Chipocalypse Now".
 Gwendolyn Zapp (voiced by Cheri Oteri) is the CEO of the BigTech technology company. She is an eccentric and slightly mad inventor, creating high-tech products that tend to go haywire.

Notable guest stars
 Waiter (voiced by Jim Rash) appears in "Fill Bill."
 Fish (voiced by Busta Rhymes) appears in "Fill Bill."
 Pepper Merchant (voiced by Griffin McElroy) appears in "Feud Fight".
 Louis (voiced by Jon Hamm) appears in "Big Deal".
 Jyle (voiced by Wallace Shawn) appears in "Night Bill".
 Dr. Enamel (voiced by Eric Jacobson as Fozzie Bear) appears in "Hurty Tooth".
 Wyatt (voiced by Alex Hirsch) appears in "Park Pandemonium".
 Donny Tinselton (voiced by Thomas Middleditch) appears in "Cricket's Kapowie".
 Hair Stylist (voiced by Jonathan Van Ness) appears in "Cricket's Kapowie".
 Santa Claus (voiced by Christopher Lloyd) appears in "Green Christmas".
 Mr. Whistler (voiced by Ed Begley Jr.) appears in "Reckoning Ball" and "Chipwrecked."
 Grampa Green (voiced by Tim Blake Nelson) appears in "Garage Tales".
 Phoenix (voiced by Jameela Jamil) appears in "Animal Farm" and "Homeward Hound".
 Cogburn (voiced by Alfred Molina) appears in "Animal Farm" and "Homeward Hound".
 Other Bill Green (voiced by Jim O'Heir) appears in "Animal Farm".
 Canteloupe Sinclair (voiced by Melissa Fumero) appears in "Dolled Up".
 Tom Hanks (voiced by himself) speaks offscreen at the end of "Cheap Show".
 Mimi O'Malley (voiced by Lucy Lawless) appears in "Cricket's Tickets".
 Gertie (voiced by Sandy Martin) appears in "Super Gramma!".
 Librarian (voiced by Linda Hamilton) appears in "Quiet Please".
 Chairwoman (voiced by Mary Holland) appears in "Chipwrecked".
 Mayor Hansock (voiced by Andy Richter) appears in "Chipocalypse Now" and "Spaghetti Theory".
 Ronald Featherman (voiced by David Wain) appears in "Winter Greens".
 Kevin (voiced by Booboo Stewart) appears in "Winter Greens".
 Kara Karaoke (voiced by Macy Gray) appears in "Okay Karaoke".
 Viper Fang (voiced by Joe Manganiello) appears in "Spaghetti Theory" and "Takened".
 Rick (voiced by David Harbour) appears in "The Van".
 Community Dan (voiced by Rob Riggle) appears in "Bat Girl".
 Gina (voiced by Riki Lindhome) appears in "The Gifted".
 Janice (voiced by Lennon Parham) appears in "Papaganda".
 Dirk (voiced by Ken Marino) appears in "No Service".
 Mr. Fluffenfold (voiced by Patton Oswalt) appears in "DependaBill".
 Doug Perkins (voiced by Tom Gammill) appears in "DependaBill".
 Ms. Torres (voiced by Rosie Perez) appears in "The Delivernator".
 Frilled Lizard (voiced by Wiz Khalifa) appears in "Rembo".
 Patti (voiced by Brooke Dillman) appears in "Pie Hard", "Frilly Tilly", and "Horse Girl".
 Wayne (voiced by Tony Cavalero) appears in "Pie Hard" and "Frilly Tilly".
 Tina (voiced by Sydney Park) appears in "Pizza Deliverance".
 Mr. Extras (voiced by Alfonso Ribeiro) appears in "Virtually Christmas".

Production
On March 8, 2016, Disney XD greenlit the series under the title of Country Club. The series is created by the brothers Chris and Shane Houghton, who originally worked on Nickelodeon's Harvey Beaks. Chris Houghton also worked as a storyboard artist on Gravity Falls with Rob Renzetti. The series was later renamed to Big City Greens on July 21, 2017. The show's animation is done entirely in traditional pen and paper as opposed to digital ink. The theme song was written and performed by The Mowgli's, and on July 28, 2017, a sneak peek of it was revealed at the 2017 San Diego Comic-Con and was uploaded to Disney XD's YouTube channel on the same day. On May 17, 2018, it was reported that Disney Channel had ordered a second season of Big City Greens ahead of the series' debut. On October 7, 2019, it was announced that the second season would premiere on November 4, 2019, however, it got pushed back to November 16, 2019. On January 13, 2021, the series was renewed for a third season. On January 21, 2022, the series was renewed for a fourth season.

During production for the first season, an episode titled "Hands-On History" was in development. The episode was directed by Monica Ray, from a story by Carson Montgomery, also being written and storyboarded by Caldwell Tanner and Cheyenne Curtis. It featured Mark Hamill in the role of Dr. Ponderstein, a sinister curator who ran a museum. The plot focused on Cricket and Remy at odds with one another, over Ponderstein's method of educating children. The episode was shelved when the Houghton Brothers found Remy's behavior in the episode unlikeable - they could not find a way to make the story work so early in the show's run. On cancelling the episode, co-creator Chris Houghton stated, "[W]e killed that episode for the best of reasons: it just didn’t work. We broke and re-broke the story a ton of times. Reboarded it again and again. Sometimes the best course of action is to take your creation out behind the shed, ya know?" The episode's production number, 110, would be given to "Parade Day" and "DIY Guys" instead.

Release
When announced, the series was scheduled to premiere in 2018 on Disney XD; however, on March 26, 2018, it was reported that the series would debut on Disney Channel in mid-2018. On May 17, 2018, The Hollywood Reporter reported that the series would premiere on Disney Channel as part of Disney Channel's GO! Summer on June 18, 2018. The series premiere was made available for streaming via the DisneyNow app and the Disney Channel YouTube channel as of June 8, 2018. Additional new episodes premiered on This Week Mornings at 10:00 AM throughout the summer. In addition, Big City Greens shorts began airing on Disney Channel and Disney Channel’s YouTube channel on June 4, 2018.

Ratings
 

| link2             = List of Big City Greens episodes#Season 2 (2019–21)
| episodes2         = 30
| start2            = 
| end2              = 
| startrating2      = 0.54
| endrating2        = 0.31
| viewers2          = |2}} 

| link3             = List of Big City Greens episodes#Season 3 (2021–23)
| episodes3         = 18
| start3            = 
| end3              = 
| startrating3      = 0.39
| endrating3        = 
| viewers3          = |2}} 
}}

Reception

Critical response
Big City Greens received a positive reception from critics. Common Sense Medias Emily Ashby praised the series for its characters and themes, writing that "despite mining familiar stereotypes of rural dwellers, the show has strong family-centric themes and silly, lighthearted laughs". Bekah Burbank of LaughingPlace.com praised the series' characters, stating that "While the mischief and antics are super silly and completely ridiculous, the characters themselves are quite fun. Just like it is with every family, the quirkiness is what you come to love most about the people you spend time with. The Green family might not be perfect, but they’re positive, supportive, and optimistic no matter the situation. Everyone could benefit from spending a little time with this wacky family".

Accolades

Film
Along with a fourth season, a musical film was announced to be in development, with the series' main cast returning. Series director Anne O'Brian will helm the film, with Michael Coughling producing. The film is set to be released on both Disney Channel and Disney+. The film is titled Big City Greens: The Movie.

Other media

Video game
A multiplayer game titled Big City Battle!, where players compete against each other in order to earn a place as a member of the Green family, was released on the DisneyNOW app.

NHL broadcast
On March 14, 2023, ESPN presented a youth-oriented, Big City Greens-themed telecast of a National Hockey League game between the Washington Capitals and the New York Rangers—the NHL Big City Greens Classic —on Disney Channel, Disney XD, Disney+ and ESPN+. The broadcast leveraged the NHL Edge player and puck tracking system, combined with technology from Beyond Sports, to present a real-time 3D animated recreation of the game; the teams' players were represented by avatars on an outdoor rink, with Vincent Trocheck and Evgeny Kuznetsov being portrayed by avatars of Cricket and Tilly respectively (with their voice actors also using live facial motion capture), and the goalies portrayed by Grandma Alice and Bill Green. Gloria and Remy also joined the game during the last few minutes. Commentators Kevin Weekes and Drew Carter were featured via motion captured avatars, developed by the animation studio Silver Spoon (which had previously worked with CBS Sports and Nickelodeon on similar motion captured avatars of segments of an youth-oriented NFL broadcast. The broadcast on Disney Channel drew approximately 140,000 viewers.

References

External links
 
 Production website
 

2010s American animated television series
2020s American animated television series
2018 American television series debuts
American children's animated adventure television series
American children's animated comedy television series
Disney Channel original programming
English-language television shows
Television series by Disney Television Animation
Animated television series about families